Veysəlli (also, Veysalli and Veyselli) is a village and municipality in the Goychay Rayon of Azerbaijan.  It has a population of 278.

References 

Populated places in Goychay District